Lewis Michael Arquette (December 14, 1935 – February 10, 2001) was an American actor. He was best known for playing J.D. Pickett on the television series The Waltons, on which he worked from 1978 to 1981.

Life and career 
Arquette was born in Chicago, Illinois, the son of Mildred Nesbitt Le May and actor Cliff Arquette. He was related to explorer Meriwether Lewis, for whom he was named. His family's surname was originally "Arcouet", coming from his partial French-Canadian ancestry. His children are actors Patricia, Alexis, Rosanna, David, and Richmond Arquette. He is the former father-in-law of actress Courteney Cox, film composer James Newton Howard, and actors Thomas Jane and Nicolas Cage. Arquette frequently appeared in movies with his sons.

While living in Chicago, Arquette managed The Second City theater for several years. In 1970, the family moved to a Subud commune (described by Patricia as a "hippie commune") in Front Royal, Virginia. His wife, Brenda Olivia "Mardi" (née Nowak), died in 1997 from breast cancer. She was Jewish and the daughter of a Holocaust refugee from Poland, while Lewis Arquette, raised a Catholic, was a convert to Islam.

Arquette died in Los Angeles, California on February 10, 2001, at the age of 65, due to congestive heart failure.

Filmography

Actor 

 The Very Naked Canvas (1965)
 Alice (1977, TV Series) .... Officer Hertzig
 Man from Atlantis (1977, TV Series) .... Friar Laurence
 Ruby and Oswald (1978, TV Movie) (a.k.a. Four Days in Dallas)
 Loose Shoes (1978) (a.k.a. Coming Attractions, a.k.a. Quackers) .... Warden
 Rescue from Gilligan's Island (1978, TV Movie) .... Judge
 Fantasy Island (1978–1981, TV Series) .... Slocumb / Fred Waters / Jeff Logan
 The Waltons (1978–1981, TV Series) .... Jefferson Davis 'J.D.' Pickett
 Barney Miller (1979, TV Series) .... Finney
 The China Syndrome (1979) .... Hatcher
 Mrs. Columbo (1979, TV Series) (a.k.a. Kate Columbo (USA), a.k.a. Kate Loves a Mystery, a.k.a. Kate the Detective – The Valley Strangler) .... Howard
 Tenspeed and Brown Shoe (1980, TV Series) .... Lieber
 The Jayne Mansfield Story (1980, TV Movie) (a.k.a. Jayne Mansfield: A Symbol of the 50s) .... Publicity Man
 Pray TV (1980) (a.k.a. K-GOD) .... Fred Wilson
 The Incredible Hulk (1981, TV Series) .... Les Creaseman
 The Smurfs (1981–1987, TV Series) ... a.k.a. Smurfs' Adventures) .... (voice)
 Simon & Simon (1982, TV Series) .... Matt
 Off the Wall (1983) .... Prison Chaplain
 Remington Steele (1983, TV Series) .... Stuart Thorpe
 Riptide (1984, TV Series) .... Sidney Gorman
 Matt Houston (1984, TV Series) .... City Councilman Roberts
 St. Elsewhere (1984, TV Series) .... Judge Ellsworth
 Challenge of the GoBots (1984, TV Series) .... (voice)
 Meitantei Holmes (1984–1985, TV Series) (a.k.a. Sherlock Hound, the Detective) .... Dr. Watson (English version, voice)
 E/R (1984, TV Series) .... Arnie Popkin (as Louis Arquette)
 Badge of the Assassin (1985, TV Movie) .... 1st Foreman
 The Fall Guy (1985, TV Series) .... Ghost
 Rocky Road (1985–1986, TV Series) .... Lucas Buchanan
 Rock 'n' Wrestling (1985, TV Series) (a.k.a. Hulk Hogan's Rock 'N' Wrestling (USA: complete title)) .... Superfly Jimmy Snuka (voice)
 Just Between Friends (1986) .... TV Station Guard
 The Check Is in the Mail (1986) (a.k.a. The Cheque Is in the Post (UK)) .... Man at pool
 Sledge Hammer! (1986, TV Series) (a.k.a. Sledge Hammer: The Early Years (USA: second season title)) .... Jacob
 Nobody's Fool (1986, with daughter Rosanna) .... Mr. Fry
 Tall Tales & Legends (1986, TV Series) (a.k.a. Shelley Duvall's Tall Tales and Legends (USA: complete title)) .... George / Jimbo Smith / Narrator
 Perfect Strangers (1987, TV Series) .... Rowdy Hockey Fan #1 (as Louis Arquette)
 Mama's Family (1986, TV Series) .... Grand Viper
 Married... with Children (1987, TV Series) .... Ed
 ALF (1987, TV Series) .... Ed Billings
 Big Business (1988) .... Mr. Stokes
 The Great Outdoors (1988) .... Herm
 Akira (1988) .... Doctor Onishi / Council 2 / Senator / Clown / Crowd Skeptic / Resistance 1 (voice: Streamline Pictures dub)
 A Pup Named Scooby-Doo (1988, TV Series) .... (voice)
 Dance 'til Dawn (1988, TV Movie) .... Pawnbroker
 My First Love (1988, TV Movie) .... Mark Grossman
 A Very Brady Christmas (1988, TV Movie) .... Sam / Santa
 Paradise (1988–1989, TV Series) (a.k.a. Guns of Paradise (new title)) .... Mr. Sinclair
 Quantum Leap (1989, TV Series).... Father Muldooney
 The Horror Show (1989) (a.k.a. Horror House, a.k.a. House 3 (Australia: video title), a.k.a. House III: The Horror Show (UK: video title)) .... Lt. Miller
 Kiki's Delivery Service (1989) (a.k.a. Kiki's Delivery Service (USA), a.k.a. The Witch's Express Mail (literal title)) .... (English version, voice)
 Charles in Charge (1989, TV Series)....  Clarence Lembeck
 Chopper Chicks in Zombietown (1989) (a.k.a. Cycle Sluts (USA)) .... Sheriff Bugiere
 Dad (1989) .... (voice)
 Tango & Cash (1989) .... Wyler
 Camp Candy (1989–1992, TV Series) .... Rex DeForest III (voice)
 Tales from the Crypt (1990, TV Series) (a.k.a. HBO's Tales from the Crypt – Lower Berth) .... Ernest Feeley
 Captain Planet and the Planeteers (1990, TV Series short) (a.k.a. The New Adventures of Captain Planet (USA: fourth season title)) .... (voice)
 Syngenor (1990) .... Ethan Valentine
 Gravedale High (1990, TV Series) (a.k.a. Rick Moranis in Gravedale High (USA: complete title)) .... (voice)
 Matlock (1990, TV Series) .... Commissioner
 Book of Love (1990) .... Mr. Malloy
 Get a Life (1991, TV Series) .... Justice of the Peace
 Rock 'n' Roll High School Forever (1991) .... Mr. Cheese
 Morton & Hayes (1991, TV Series) .... Mr. Caldicott
 The Linguini Incident (1991) .... Texas Joe
 Double Trouble (1992) .... Tarlow
 Let's Kill All the Lawyers (1992) .... Antinus
 L.A. Law (1992, TV Series) .... Inspector Dodek
 Beverly Hills, 90210 (1992, TV Series) .... Priest
 A Child Lost Forever: The Jerry Sherwood Story (1992, TV Movie) (a.k.a. A Child Lost Forever (USA: short title)) .... Walter Vinton
 Tainted Blood (1993, TV Movie) .... Artie
 Attack of the 50 Ft. Woman (1993, TV Movie) .... Mr. Ingersol
 Menendez: A Killing in Beverly Hills (1994, TV Movie) .... Lyle's Jury: Juror #3
 Sleep with Me (1994) .... Minister
 Freddy Pharkas: Frontier Pharmacist (1994, Video Game) .... Whittlin' Willie / P. H. Balance (voice)
 Saved by the Bell: The New Class (1994, TV Series) .... Uncle Lester
 The Flintstones: Wacky Inventions (1994, Video short) .... Prof, Einstone (voice)
 SeaQuest DSV (1995, TV Series) (a.k.a. SeaQuest 2032 (USA: new title)) .... Kearny
 Stuart Saves His Family (1995) .... Cemetery official
 Wild Side (1995) .... The Chief
 Seinfeld (1995, Episode: "The Secret Code") .... Leapin' Larry
 Babylon 5 (1996, TV Series) (a.k.a. B5 (USA: promotional abbreviation)) .... General Smits
 Hypernauts (1996, TV Series) .... Horten (voice)
 Waiting for Guffman (1996) .... Clifford Wooley
 The Real Adventures of Jonny Quest (1996, TV Series) (a.k.a. Jonny Quest: The Real Adventures – The Ballad of Belle Bonnet) .... Civilian / Driver (voice)
 Mojave Moon (1996) .... Charlie
 Kid Cop (1996) .... Mayor Cosgrove
 Fox Hunt (1996) .... The Wolf
 Meet Wally Sparks (1997) .... Cardinal
 Princess Mononoke (1997) .... (English version, voice)
 Life During Wartime (1997) (a.k.a. The Alarmist (USA: new title)) .... Bruce Hudler
 The Westing Game (1997, TV Movie) (a.k.a. Get a Clue (USA: video title)) .... Otis Amber
 Kiss & Tell (1997) .... Inspector Dan Furbal
 Sleepwalkers (1997, TV Series)
 Born Bad (1997) .... Bank Manager
 Scream 2 (1997) .... Chief Lewis Hartley
 Murder One: Diary of a Serial Killer (1997, TV Mini-Series)
 A River Made to Drown In (1997) .... Vagabond
 Adventures with Barbie: Ocean Discovery (1997, Video Game) .... (voice)
 Spawn (1997–1999, TV Series) (a.k.a. Todd McFarlane's Spawn) .... (voice)
 Twilight (1998) .... Water Pistol Man
 Almost Heroes (1998) .... Merchant
 Ready to Rumble (2000) .... Fred King
 Best in Show (2000) .... Fern City Show Spectator
 Little Nicky (2000) .... Cardinal
 Escape from Monkey Island (2000, Video Game) .... Freddie (voice)
 FreakyLinks (2001, TV Series) .... Bob Frewer
 Out Cold (2001) .... Herbert 'Papa' Muntz
 As Told by Ginger (2000–2001, TV Series) .... Mr Cilia (voice)

Writer 
 The Lorenzo and Henrietta Music Show (1976) TV Series (writer)

Producer 
 The Lorenzo and Henrietta Music Show (1976) TV Series (executive producer)

Himself 
 This Is Your Life – Cliff Arquette (1960) TV Episode .... Himself
 The Jonathan Winters Show – Episode dated April 3, 1969 (1969) TV Episode .... Himself

References

External links 
 
 
 

1935 births
2001 deaths
Male actors from Chicago
American male film actors
American male television actors
American male voice actors
Television producers from Illinois
American television writers
American male television writers
Lewis Arquette
Burials at Rose Hills Memorial Park
People from Front Royal, Virginia
Screenwriters from Virginia
Screenwriters from Illinois
American people of French-Canadian descent
American people of English descent
20th-century American male actors
American Muslims
Converts to Islam from Catholicism
American Subud members
20th-century American screenwriters
Television producers from Virginia